Badoda is a city and a municipality in Sheopur district  in the state of Madhya Pradesh, India.

Demographics
 India census, Badoda had a population of 15,672. Males constitute 53% of the population and females 47%. Badoda has an average literacy rate of 48%, lower than the national average of 59.5%; with 67% of the males and 33% of females literate. 19% of the population is under 6 years of age.

References

Sheopur